The Sailor Who Fell from Grace with the Sea is a 1976 British drama film starring Kris Kristofferson and Sarah Miles, directed by Lewis John Carlino. It was adapted from the 1963 novel The Sailor Who Fell from Grace with the Sea by the Japanese writer Yukio Mishima. The location was changed to the English town of Dartmouth, Devon, where it was also filmed.

Plot
Jonathan Osborne, the 14-year-old son of widow Anne Osborne, has become involved with a group of boys led by a neo-Nietzschean sadistic boy named "Chief". Anne daydreams about her husband who died three years earlier. When a large merchant ship anchors temporarily in the harbour, Anne arranges to give her son a tour of the vessel. They meet the second officer of the ship, Jim Cameron. Jim takes a liking to both the boy and his mother. Jim and Anne become involved sexually, which throws Jonathan into a rage of jealousy. Cameron returns to sea and while he is gone, Jonathan reveals his jealous sentiment to the group leader, Chief. When Cameron comes back to renew his relationship with Anne and forsake his life on the sea, Chief and the boys concoct a sinister plot to do away with the intruder.

Cast
Sarah Miles as Anne Osborne
Kris Kristofferson as Jim Cameron
Jonathan Kahn as Jonathan Osborne
Margo Cunningham as Mrs. Palmer
Earl Rhodes as "Chief"
Paul Tropea as "No:2"

Production
The movie was filmed on location in and around Dartmouth, Devon, England.

Reception
John C Mahoney saw the central triangle through the prism of Greek myth: "How much Oedipal vengeance is there in his sense of betrayal by adults, his growing conviction that he must participate in a ritual to return Kristofferson to his place in the pure order of the sea and away from the corruption of his code on land? The intricate ambiguities are the substance of Sailor. Kristofferson is an uncommonly strong presence, who does not appear to try to exceed the limitations of a natural performance. Miles gives a superior performance, a pure and unsuspecting Circe sending out a sensual call". However John Simon, reviewed it as: "very pretty to look at, and makes absolutely no sense".

Awards
Nominee Best Actress Golden Globe award (Sarah Miles)
Nominee Best Actor Debut Golden Globe award (Jonathan Kahn)

Availability
On June 19, 2012, Shout! Factory released the film to Blu-ray.

References

Bibliography
"News of the Screen; A New Tarzan From Old Novel Major Film Due On War in Spain Davidson Taps I. B. Singer Novel Mishima 'Sailor' To Be Made in West", NY Times, August 4, 1974, Section GN, Page 43. (Subscription required)

External links

British mystery thriller films
British thriller drama films
1970s mystery thriller films
1970s thriller drama films
Films scored by Johnny Mandel
Films based on Japanese novels
Films based on works by Yukio Mishima
Films with screenplays by Lewis John Carlino
Embassy Pictures films
1976 drama films
1970s English-language films
Films directed by Lewis John Carlino
1970s British films

ja:午後の曳航#映画化